IPA Extensions is a block (U+0250–U+02AF) of the Unicode standard that contains full size letters used in the International Phonetic Alphabet (IPA). Both modern and historical characters are included, as well as former and proposed IPA signs and non-IPA phonetic letters. Additional characters employed for phonetics, like the palatalization sign, are encoded in the blocks Phonetic Extensions (1D00–1D7F) and Phonetic Extensions Supplement (1D80–1DBF). Diacritics are found in the Spacing Modifier Letters (02B0–02FF) and Combining Diacritical Marks (0300–036F) blocks. Its block name in Unicode 1.0 was Standard Phonetic.

With the ability to use Unicode for the presentation of IPA symbols, ASCII-based systems such as X-SAMPA are being supplanted. Within the Unicode blocks there are also a few former IPA characters no longer in international use by linguists.

Character table

Subheadings
The IPA Extensions block contains only three subheadings, each associated with a set of characters encoded in a different version of Unicode, IPA extensions, IPA characters for disordered speech, and Additions for Sinology.

IPA extensions
The IPA extensions are the first 89 characters of the IPA Extensions block, which includes Latin character variants and Greek borrowings that are regularly used only in IPA contexts. The characters of the IPA extensions subheading were part of the original Unicode 1.0.

IPA characters for disordered speech
The extIPA characters for disordered speech are additions to the IPA for phonemes that do not occur in natural languages, but are needed for recording pre-linguistic utterances by babies, gibberish from otherwise lingual individuals, and other non-linguistic but phonetic utterances. The IPA characters for disordered speech were added to the IPA Extensions block in Unicode version 3.0.

Additions for Sinology
The Additions for Sinology are two additional symbols for phonemic transcription of the languages of China. The Additions for Sinology were added to the IPA Extensions block in Unicode version 4.0.

Compact table

History

The IPA Extensions block has been present in Unicode since version 1.0, and was unchanged through the unification with ISO 10646. The block was filled out with extensions for representing disordered speech in version 3.0, and Sinological phonetic symbols in version 4.0.

The following Unicode-related documents record the purpose and process of defining specific characters in the IPA Extensions block:

References 

Latin-script Unicode blocks
International Phonetic Alphabet
Unicode blocks